Webbville is an unincorporated community in Lawrence County, Kentucky, United States. Webbville had a post office from January 11, 1867, until March 23, 2013; it still has its own ZIP code, 41180. The community contains one small business: Perkins Sawmill.

Webbville was the last stop of the Eastern Kentucky Railway which ran until the early 1930s.

References

Unincorporated communities in Lawrence County, Kentucky
Unincorporated communities in Kentucky